Manfred Hürlimann (born September 29, 1958) is a Swiss painter.

References

This article was initially translated from the German Wikipedia.

20th-century Swiss painters
Swiss male painters
21st-century Swiss painters
21st-century Swiss male artists
1958 births
Living people
20th-century Swiss male artists